Misteriosa Buenos Aires (Spanish for Mysterious Buenos Aires) is a 1950 book of literary fiction by Manuel Mujica Lainez, containing no fewer that 42 short stories (average length: 6.4 pages) illustrating life in Buenos Aires from the time of its mythical First Foundation, in 1536, to 1904.

The book is ultimately a digest of civilized life on the site of the Great City and one of the prime examples of a key theme in Argentine literature, first invoked by Sarmiento: the dualistic struggle between Civilization and Barbarism.

The first story, "El hambre" ("Famine") shows the first European settlers starving behind a flimsy, improvised palisade, as they nervously eye the Indian bonfires in the surrounding darkness. The final tale, "El salón dorado" ("The Gold Drawing-room")  has a ruined grande dame of 1904 sitting despairingly in the golden salon of her great mansion, awaiting the auctioneers, "like gray and black animals, like wolves and hyenas around the great bonfire".

One need not know that there is precisely such a richly appointed "Salón Dorado" in Buenos Aires' City Hall building to understand that fate has come full circle for the failed Great City, that barbarism has triumphed, that it always does.  Mujica Laínez' cool and urbane tone is slyly deceptive: his manner might be a subtly ironic homage to Octave Feuillet, but his vision is profoundly pessimistic, even chilling, in the classic Spanish desengaño school.

Misteriosa Buenos Aires is a key link in the author's Buenos Aires cycle.

1950 short story collections
Argentine short story collections
Novels set in Buenos Aires
Buenos Aires in fiction